We Need Answers is a British television panel game presented by comedians Mark Watson, Tim Key and Alex Horne. The show features a pair of celebrities answering questions which had previously been texted in by the public, or the audience by text message.

The show ran for two series between February 2009 and February 2010.

Format
In We Need Answers, Watson acted as the main host, Key as the question master, and Horne as the studio expert, as well as the man responsible for the computer graphics and sound effects used in the show.

During the show, correct answers scored two points, wrong answers scored nothing, and one point was given to an answer which was "quite right", or partly correct. Recurring themes in the series included "Sad Questions", relating to morbid topics and accompanied by sad music.

The quiz was split into the following rounds:

 Burning Issues and Fiddly Questions: Key asked questions to each contestant in turn, some of which were based around a general theme covering the episode.
 You or Him/Her: The contestant could each answer a question about themselves, or try and score double points by answering questions about their opponent. In the first series this round always featured Horne explaining the doubling rule.
 The Physical Challenge: The contestants took part in a physical challenge based on a question texted to them.
 Quick fire Meltdown Round: A round of quick fire questions on buzzers, with all the questions scoring double points. It was a timed round with a time on the bottom of the TV screen depicting the faces of the contestants. The round ended when the face hit each other. At the end of this round, the contestant with the lowest score lost and left the studio wearing "The clogs of defeat. The winner received a certificate.
 Big Money/House Prize Showdown: The winner could choose to answer a special question for a small cash prize or, in the second series, an item from one of the hosts' houses.

History
"We Need Answers" first saw the light as a late night comedy show at the Canal Cafe Theatre in London. After a year's development it was taken to Edinburgh Fringe for two years running, sponsored by 63336.
The contestants in Edinburgh were exclusively standup comedians, who were at the festival with their own shows.

In its inaugural year at the fringe, 2007, the competition featured the likes of Daniel Kitson, Simon Amstell, Henning Wehn, Brendon Burns & Lucy Porter taking part in the quiz, which took the format of a traditional sporting tournament over the month; heats leading to quarter and semi finals. 
The grand final was between Josie Long and Paul Sinha, with Sinha proving to be the ultimate winner.

Its second year, 2008, saw a final between Josie Long and Kristen Schaal: Long emerged victorious.

In late 2008 the BBC produced a pilot at Ginglik comedy club, London, before launching Series 1 on BBC4 early 2009.

Episodes

Series 1

Series 2

No More Women / No More Jockeys

No More Women is an oral game invented in 2002 by the comedians Mark Watson and Tim Key. During the writing of a show, Key challenged Watson to name as many famous people as he could. After listing many football and cricket players, Watson commented "OK, no more footballers", and this was developed into a game which the two of them played with Alex Horne for years.

The rules of the game are that each player in turn declares the name of a famous person and a category into which that person falls, to which no subsequent answer may belong (e.g., "Marie Curie - no more women"). If a player names a person who belongs to a category and is challenged about it, or is unable to think of a person, they are eliminated from the game. A player may insist their opponent "name another", to prevent the creation of categories which exclude only a single person. The game can also be played with a chess clock.

A web-exclusive show No More Women was broadcast on the BBC Comedy website in 2009 as a spin-off from We Need Answers. Watson, Key and Horne have sometimes played the game live on stage, for instance at London's Canal Cafe Theatre one Sunday afternoon in 2006. The game was also played on the Radio 4 show It's Your Round in March 2011, when Key was one of the panellists and his competitors were Bridget Christie, Micky Flanagan and Nick Hancock.

The game was relaunched in June 2020 as No More Jockeys with its own channel on YouTube and codified rules. A series of games were played as a weekly three-way contest between Horne, Key, and Watson, across a video link, during the COVID-19 pandemic. The games continued over the year, and Esquire magazine called the series a "lockdown phenomenon". The Daily Telegraph praised the "perfect comic chemistry" of the trio, and described No More Jockeys as a parlour game "for the ages". A live, ticketed edition of the game was broadcast for the Leicester Comedy Festival in February 2021, and became the fastest selling show in the festival's history. In March 2021, the Chortle Awards gave "Legends of Lockdown" prizes to Horne, Key and Watson, partly for No More Jockeys as well as their own individual works. Among the most commonly played names in No More Jockeys are: Penelope Pitstop; Mert Aksaç, star of the Turkish film Film (2011); Jack Lisowski; and Wilfred Johnson, newborn son of Boris Johnson.

References
General

External links

No More Jockeys on YouTube

2009 British television series debuts
2010 British television series endings
BBC television comedy
BBC television game shows
BBC high definition shows
British panel games
2000s British game shows
2010s British game shows
Quiz shows
English-language television shows
Television series by BBC Studios